Huixin Xijie Beikou station is a station on Line 5 of the Beijing Subway.

Station layout
The station has 2 underground side platforms.

Exits 
There are 3 exits, lettered A, B, and C. Exit C is accessible.

References

External links
 

Beijing Subway stations in Chaoyang District
Railway stations in China opened in 2007